The Indian Administrative Service (IAS) is the administrative arm of the All India Services of Government of India. Considered the premier civil service of India, The IAS is a part of the union civil services and is  one of the three arms of the All India Services along with the Indian Police Service being a part of union civil services and the Indian Forest Service being a part of the union natural resources services.  Members of these three services serve the Government of India as well as the individual states. IAS officers are also deployed to various government establishments such as constitutional bodies, staff & line agencies, auxiliary bodies, public sector undertakings, regulatory bodies, statutory bodies and autonomous bodies.

As with other countries following the parliamentary system of government, the IAS is a part of the permanent bureaucracy of the nation; and is an inseparable part of the executive of the Government of India. As such, the bureaucracy remains politically neutral and guarantees administrative continuity to the ruling party or coalition.

Upon confirmation of service, an IAS officer serves a probationary period as a sub-divisional magistrate. Completion of this probation is followed by an executive administrative role in a district as a district magistrate and collector which lasts several years. After this tenure, an officer may be promoted to head a whole state administrative division as a divisional commissioner.

On attaining the higher scales of the pay matrix, IAS officers may lead government departments or ministries. In these roles, IAS officers represent the country at international level in bilateral and multilateral negotiations. If serving on a deputation, they may be employed in intergovernmental organisations such as the World Bank, the International Monetary Fund, the Asian Development Bank, the Asian Infrastructure Investment Bank, or the United Nations, or its agencies. IAS officers are also involved in conducting elections in India as mandated by the Election Commission of India.

History

During the East India Company period, the civil services were classified into threecovenanted, uncovenanted and special civil services. The covenanted civil service, or the Honourable East India Company's Civil Service (HEICCS), as it was called, largely comprised civil servants occupying the senior posts in the government. The uncovenanted civil service was introduced solely to facilitate the entry of Indians onto the lower rung of the administration. The special service comprised specialised departments, such as the Indian Forest Service, the Imperial Police and the Indian Political Service, whose ranks were drawn from either the covenanted civil service or the Indian Army. The Imperial Police included many Indian Army officers among its members, although after 1893 an annual exam was used to select its officers. In 1858 the HEICCS was replaced by the Indian Civil Service (ICS), which became the highest civil service in India between 1858 and 1947. The last appointments to the ICS were made in 1942.

With the passing of the Government of India Act 1919 by the Parliament of the United Kingdom, the Indian civil services—under the general oversight of the Secretary of State for India—were split into two arms, the All India Services and the Central Services. The Indian Civil Service was one of the ten All India Services.

In 1946 at the Premier's Conference, the Central Cabinet decided to form the Indian Administrative Service, based on the Indian Civil Service; and the Indian Police Service, based on the Imperial Police.

When India was partitioned following the departure of the British in 1947, the Indian Civil Service was divided between the new dominions of India and Pakistan. The Indian remnant of the ICS was named the Indian Administrative Service, while the Pakistani remnant was named the Pakistan Administrative Service. The modern Indian Administrative Service was created under Article 312(2) in part XIV of the Constitution of India, and the All India Services Act, 1951.

Indian Frontier Administrative Service 
A special cadre was created in 1954 to administer NEFA (present day Arunachal Pradesh) and for later all North Eastern Region. It was first mooted by then Prime Minister Jawahar Lal Nehru.

The services were placed under Ministry of External Affairs.

In 1968, IFAS was merged with IAS. However Chief Ministers from Arunachal Pradesh and Mizoram revival of IFAS.

Recruitment 

There are three modes of recruitment into the Indian Administrative Service. IAS officers may enter the IAS by passing the Civil Services Examination, which is conducted by the Union Public Service Commission (UPSC). Officers recruited this way are called direct recruits. Some IAS officers are also recruited from the state civil services, and, in rare cases, selected from non-state civil service. The ratio between direct recruits and promotees is fixed at 2:1. All IAS officers, regardless of the mode of entry, are appointed by the President of India.

Only about 180 candidates out of over 1million applicants, who apply through CSE, are successful, a success rate of less than 0.02percent.

Unlike candidates appointed to other civil services, a successful IAS candidate is rendered ineligible to retake CSE. From 1951 to 1978, an IAS candidate was required to submit two additional papers, as well as three optional papers (instead of two as with other civil services) to be eligible for the Indian Administrative Service or the Indian Foreign Service. The two additional papers were postgraduate level submissions, compared to the graduate level of the optional papers, and it was this distinction that resulted in a higher status for the IAS and IFS. The two postgraduate level submissions were later removed, but this has not changed the perceived higher status of the IAS and IFS. After the selection process, the successful candidates undergo training at the Lal Bahadur Shastri National Academy of Administration in Mussoorie, Uttarakhand.

State cadres

Cadre allocation policy 
The central government announced a new cadre allocation policy for the All India Services in August 2017, touting it as a policy to ensure national integration of the bureaucracy and to ensure an All India character of the services. The existing twenty O sixcadres were to be divided into fivezones by the Department of Personnel and Training. Under the new policy, a candidate first selects their zones of preference, in descending order, then indicates a cadre preference from each preferred zone. The candidate indicates their second cadre preference for every preferred zone subsequently. The preference for the zones and cadres remains in the same order and no change is permitted.

Officers remain in their allocated cadre or are deputed to the Government of India.

Previous cadre allocation policies 
Until 2008, there was no formal system that permitted the selection of a state cadre preferred by the candidate. If the candidate was not placed in a vacancy in their home state, they would be allocated to other states, which were selected from a roster in alphabetic order, starting from 'a', 'h', 'm' or 't', depending on the year. For example, if in a particular year the roster begins from 'a', then the first candidate on the roster will go to the Andhra Pradesh state cadre, the next one to Bihar, and then to Chhattisgarh, Gujarat and so on in alphabetical order. The next year the roster starts from 'h', for either Haryana or Himachal Pradesh (the two states alternate roster years). This system, practised since the mid-1980s, ensured that officers from different states were placed all over India.

The system of permanent state cadres resulted in wide disparities of professional exposure for officers when comparing those from developed versus less developed states. Changes in state cadres were only permitted on grounds of marriage to an All India Services officer of another state cadre or under other exceptional circumstances. The officers were allowed to go to their home state cadre on deputation for a limited period after which they would be required to return to their allocated cadre.

From 2008, IAS officers were assigned to state cadres at the beginning of their service. There was one cadre for each Indian state, except for twojoint cadres: Assam–Meghalaya and Arunachal Pradesh–Goa–Mizoram–Union Territories (AGMUT). The "insider-outsider ratio" (ratio of officers who were posted to their home states to those from other states) was maintained at 1:2, with one-third of the direct recruits being 'insiders' from the same state. The rest were posted as outsiders according to the state allocation roster in states other than their home states, as indicated by their preference.

Responsibilities of an IAS officer 

The typical functions performed by an IAS officer are:
 To collect revenue and function as court officials in matters of revenue and crime (for the revenue courts and criminal courts of executive magistrates), to maintain law and order, to implement union and state government policies at the grass-roots level when posted to field positions i.e. as Sub-Divisional Magistrate, Additional District Magistrate, District Magistrate and Divisional Commissioner, and to act as an agent of the government in the field, i.e. to act as an intermediary between the public and the government.
 To handle the administration and daily proceedings of the government, including the formulation and implementation of policy in consultation with the minister-in-charge of a specific ministry or department.
 To contribute to policy formulation, and to make a final decision in certain matters, with the agreement of the minister concerned or the council of ministers (depending upon the weight of the matter), when posted at the higher level in the Government of India as a joint secretary, additional secretary, special secretary or secretary equivalent, secretary and Cabinet Secretary, and in state governments as secretary, principal secretary, additional chief secretary or special chief secretary and chief secretary.

Career progression 
At the beginning of their career, IAS officers receive district training with their home cadres followed by their first posting. Their initial role is as an assistant collector cum sub-district magistrate  and they are placed in charge of a district sub-division. As assistant collector cum sub district magistrate, they are entrusted with maintaining law and order, as well as general administration and development work, of the sub-district. With the completion of their training, IAS officers are assigned to various designations  in various ministries, departments and establishments under the ownership of the union government, state governments and in local governments (municipal corporations, 
notified area councils, municipal councils and  cantonment board at urban level and gram panchayats, prakhand parishads and zilla parishads at rural level).

In 2015 it was announced that a new designation of assistant secretary at the Central Secretariat had been created to enable new IAS officers to be posted to Delhi for a three-month assignment as part of their training regime. IAS officers were previously only permitted to go on a deputation once assigned to the Central Secretariat after nine years of service in their home cadre. It was observed that the experience of central functions was severely lacking among these deputations, resulting in this change in their training. As part of the new system, IAS assistant secretaries are supposed to work on projects—a new policy in their respective areas—and present it to their respective ministries; of all projects, 36 are selected to be presented before all secretaries of the Government of India; consequently, 16 are selected to be before the Cabinet Secretary and a final eight are selected for presentation before the Prime Minister.

Completion of this probation is followed by an executive role in a district as a collector cum district magistrate, which lasts several years. After this tenure as a district magistrate, the officer may be promoted to head a whole state division, as a divisional commissioner.

On attaining the apex scale, IAS officers may lead government departments or ministries. In these roles, IAS officers represent the country at the international level in bilateral and multilateral negotiations. If serving on a deputation, they may be employed in intergovernmental organisations such as the World Bank, the International Monetary Fund, the Asian Development Bank, the Asian Infrastructure Investment Bank, and the United Nations or its agencies. IAS officers are also involved in the conduct of elections in India as mandated by the Election Commission of India.

Upon retirement, high ranking IAS officers have occupied constitutional posts such as the Chief Election Commissioner of India, the Comptroller and Auditor General of India, and the chairperson of the Union Public Service Commission (UPSC). They have also become members of administrative tribunals, such as the National Green Tribunal and the Central Administrative Tribunal, as well as chiefs of regulators including the Telecom Regulatory Authority of India, the Securities and Exchange Board of India, and the Reserve Bank of India. If a serving IAS officer is appointed to a constitutional post such as Comptroller and Auditor General of India, Chief Election Commissioner of India or chairperson of UPSC or as head of a statutory authority, such as the National Commission for Women or the Central Information Commission, he or she is deemed to have retired from service.

IAS officers can also be deputed to private organisations for a fixed tenure under Rule 6(2)(ii) of the Indian Administrative Service (Cadre) Rules, 1954.

Assessment of suitability for promotion and posting 
The performance of IAS officers is assessed through a performance appraisal report. The reports are reviewed to judge the suitability of an officer before a promotion or a posting in the union or state governments. The report is compiled annually and is initiated by the officers themselves, designated as the reporting officer, who list their achievements, completion of assigned activities and targets for the year. The report is then modified and commented on by the reviewing officer, usually the superior of the reporting officer. All the Reports are forwarded by the reviewing officer to the accepting authority, who conducts a final review of the report.

Major concerns and reforms

Shortage of officers 
It was reported in 2017 that there is a shortage of about 1,700IAS officers in the country. Despite this, the government has stated that annual recruitment of IAS officers will not increase, to avoid impacting the career progression of existing officers and the overall structure of the service.

Lateral entry 
Media personalities, some retired IAS officers and a few academics have argued in favour of lateral entry into the IAS to inject fresh blood into the service. They argue that it would help refresh the bureaucracy, offer competitiveness and bring in alternate perspectives. A counter-argument has been put forward that a lateral entry process could be manipulated due to corruption and cronyism. It is further argued that lateral entry would not lead to improvements in managerial performance or accountability, and while it may create synergy between the government and big businesses, it could also compromise the integrity of government. It has also been argued that it could weaken the bureaucracy instead. The union government has frequently ruled out lateral entry into the IAS.

Political influence 

Several think tanks and media outlets have argued that the IAS is hamstrung by political influence within the service. It has been reported that many local political leaders have been seen to have interfered with IAS officers. Politicians have also exerted pressure on IAS officers by repeatedly transferring them, suspending them, beating them, and, in some extreme cases, killing them.

While hearing T. S. R. Subramanian v. Union of India, the Supreme Court of India ruled that IAS officersand other civil servantswere not required to act on oral instructions given by politicians as they 'undermined credibility'.

Corruption 

Several academic papers have shown IAS to be a significant contributor to crony capitalism in India. In 2015, it was reported by the Government of India that a hundred IAS officers had come under scrutiny by the Central Bureau of Investigation for alleged corruption. In 2017 Government records showed that 379 IAS officers had deliberately failed to submit details of their immovable assets (IPR). Since 2007, a number of chief secretaries and a principal secretary have been arrested in cases of graft or money laundering. In 2016 it was reported that the Government would provide the means to prosecute corrupt IAS officers, with the Ministry of Personnel, Public Grievances and Pensions agreeing to receive requests from private citizens seeking punitive measures against IAS officers even without supporting documentation.

In 2017, a Central Bureau of Investigation special court in Delhi sentenced a former Union Coal Secretary and two other IAS officers to two years in prison for their involvement in the coal allocation scam.

In 2017 it was reported by the Department of Personnel and Training, part of the Ministry of Personnel, Public Grievances and Pensions, that, since 2014, one IAS officer was prematurely retired from service, ten IAS officers had been deemed to have resigned, five had their pensions cut, and a further eight IAS officers suffered a cut in remuneration.

In 2018 the Union Minister of State for Personnel, Public Grievances and Pensions, Jitendra Singh, informed the Lok Sabha that disciplinary proceedings were underway against 36 IAS officers. In 2020, Central Bureau of Investigation arrested two district magistrates in connection with an illegal arms license distribution scandal in the then Jammu & Kashmir state.

During year 2020–21, 581 corruption charges were filed against IAS officers. Further, a total of 753 complaints were received against the IAS officers in 2019-20 and 643 in 2018–19.

Abandonment of service
In June 2015, The Telegraph reported that twelve IAS officers had gone missing, and had not reported to either the union or the state government for their allocated cadre. It was believed that they were working in foreign countries for companies such as Microsoft for more lucrative pay. The Asian Age later reported that the services of three of the twelve officers were likely to be terminated due to "prolonged absence from service".

Notable IAS officers 

Naresh Chandra; a retired 1956 batch IAS officer of Rajasthan cadre, who served as the Cabinet Secretary of India, Defence Secretary of India, Home Secretary of India, Water Resource Secretary of India and Indian Ambassador to the United States. He was awarded India's second-highest civilian honour, the Padma Vibhushan, for civil service, in 2007.
Narinder Nath Vohra (N. N. Vohra); a retired 1959 batch IAS officer of Punjab cadre and the 12th Governor of the state of Jammu and Kashmir, Vohra was the first civilian Governor of Jammu and Kashmir in 18 years since Jagmohan. Vohra has also served as the Principal Secretary to the Prime Minister of India, Home Secretary of India, Defence Secretary of India and Defence Production Secretary of India. He was awarded India's second-highest civilian honour, the Padma Vibhushan, for civil service, in 2007.
 T. N. Seshan; a retired 1955 batch IAS officer of Tamil Nadu cadre, notable for enacting significant reforms to electoral oversight in India. He was the 10th Chief Election Commissioner of India (1990–96), who reformed elections by subduing electoral malpractice throughout the country and strengthened the image of the Election Commission of India. He previously served as the 18th Cabinet Secretary of India in 1989, and later as a member of the Planning Commission. He was presented the Ramon Magsaysay Award for government service in 1996.
Vinod Rai; a retired 1972 batch IAS officer of Kerala cadre, who served as the 11th Comptroller and Auditor General of India. He is widely considered a symbol of the anti-corruption movement in India. He also served as the Financial Services Secretary of India. Rai was awarded India's third highest civilian honour, the Padma Bhushan, for civil service, in 2016.
Duvvuri Subbarao; a retired 1972 batch IAS officer of Andhra Pradesh cadre. He served as the 22nd Governor of the Reserve Bank of India (RBI). A former Finance Secretary of India, he also served as a member of the Prime Minister's Economic Advisory Council, and as a senior economist in the World Bank. Subbarao's selection as RBI governor in 2008 was coincidental with the outbreak of the global financial crisis. His leadership is generally credited with safeguarding the Indian economy through the financial crisis.
Yogendra Narain; a retired 1965 batch IAS officer of Uttar Pradesh cadre. He is a former Secretary-General of Rajya Sabha, who also served as the Defence Secretary of India, Chief Secretary of Uttar Pradesh as well as Surface Transport Secretary of India. He was awarded the Dean Paul H. Appleby Award, for distinguished civil service, in 2017.

See also 
 Senior Civil Service of the United Kingdom
 Grands corps de l'État of France
 Senior Executive Service of the United States

References

Bibliography

Books

Papers

Further reading

External links

 
 Civil list of Indian Administrative Service officers as maintained by Department of Personnel and Training of Government of India.
 Executive record sheets of IAS Officers by Department of Personnel and Training of Government of India.

All India Services
Ministry of Personnel, Public Grievances and Pensions
Government agencies established in 1858
1858 establishments in India